Percy Newton (January 1904 – October 1993) was an English footballer. His regular position was at full back. He was born in Whitchurch, Shropshire. He played for Manchester United, Sandbach Ramblers and Tranmere Rovers.

External links
MUFCInfo.com profile

1904 births
1993 deaths
English footballers
Manchester United F.C. players
Tranmere Rovers F.C. players
Association football fullbacks
People from Whitchurch, Shropshire
Sandbach Ramblers F.C. players